George Alexander Merry (3 March 1869 – 2 May 1917) was a South African international rugby union player who played as a forward.

Biography
Merry was born in Scotland and a captain in the mounted police. He made his only international appearance for South Africa in their first ever Test—against Great Britain at the Crusader's Ground, Port Elizabeth as the first player from Eastern Province to represent South Africa.

Test history

See also
List of South Africa national rugby union players – Springbok no. 14

References

1869 births
1917 deaths
South African rugby union players
South Africa international rugby union players
Rugby union players from Glasgow
Rugby union forwards
Eastern Province Elephants players